William Stephens (1857–1925) was a businessman and politician in Queensland, Australia. He was a Member of the Queensland Legislative Assembly and a Member of the Queensland Legislative Council.

Early life
William Stephens was born on 7 November 1857 at South Brisbane, the son of Thomas Blacket Stephens and his wife Ann (née Connah). He was educated at Brisbane Grammar School.

Politics
Stephens was elected on 12 May 1888 to the Queensland Legislative Assembly in Woolloongabba. In the 1893 colonial election, he successfully contested the seat of South Brisbane which he held until 27 August 1904, when he was defeated in the 1904 state election. He contested South Brisbane again in the 1907 election and was successfully, representing the electorate from 18 May 1907 to 5 February 1908, when he was again defeated in the 1908 election. During this last period, he was Secretary for Public Instruction and Agriculture from 19 November 1907 to 18 February 1908.

In the 1912 election, Stephens unsuccessfully contested Buranda.

On 1 July 1912, he was appointed for life to the Queensland Legislative Council, a position he held until the Council was abolished on 23 March 1922.

William Stephens was also involved in local government. He was an alderman in the City of South Brisbane where he was mayor in 1888, 1889 and 1901. He was a long-time councillor in the Nerang Shire Council, serving a total of 36 years commencing in 1882.

Business interests
William Stephens had many business interests in South Brisbane and other areas, including:
 Kingston Butter Factory
 South Brisbane Co-operative Dairy Company
 dairy farm at Merrimac

Later life
Following ill health late in life, William Stephens collapsed from a stroke while holidaying at Southport, Queensland on Monday 27 April 1925. He was taken to a private hospital where he died on Thursday 30 April 1925. His funeral left his home Waldheim at Waldheim Street, Annerley on Friday 1 May 1925 for his burial at South Brisbane Cemetery. Many prominent citizens attended his funeral.

References

External links

Members of the Queensland Legislative Assembly
Members of the Queensland Legislative Council
1857 births
1925 deaths
Burials in South Brisbane Cemetery
Pre-Separation Queensland